Iosefa Tekori (born 17 December 1983) is a Samoan rugby union international player. He currently plays for the Stade Toulousain in the Top 14 in France. He plays as a lock.

Honours

Castres
Top 14: 2012–13

Toulouse
Top 14: 2018–19, 2020–21
European Rugby Champions Cup: 2020–21

Samoa
Pacific Nations Cup: 2010, 2012, 2014

References

External links
ESPN Scrum.com Profile

1983 births
Living people
Samoan rugby union players
Rugby union flankers
Samoa international rugby union players
Samoan expatriate rugby union players
Expatriate rugby union players in France
Samoan expatriate sportspeople in France
Auckland rugby union players
Castres Olympique players
Stade Toulousain players